Dammtor is a zone (Ort) of the German city of Hamburg, situated between the quarters of Rotherbaum (in the borough of Eimsbüttel) and Neustadt (in the borough of Mitte).

History
Originally, the Dammthor was a city gate between the Altstadt (Old town) and the Neustadt (New town). In 1866, before the opening of the Hamburg-Altona railway, the city opened a railway station at Dammtordamm, replaced in 1903 by the actual Hamburg Dammtor station.

Geography
Dammtor is situated in the middle of Hamburg, close to the Außenalster lake and to the central railway station. Its area includes the parks of Moorweide, Gustav-Mahler-Park (with a Multiplex Cinema) and the old entrance of Planten un Blomen (with the Old botanical garden).

Other notable infrastructures located in Dammtor are the rail station, the Stephansplatz, the main building of the University of Hamburg, the Congress Center, the Radisson SAS Hotel and the war memorial. Regarding the urban transport the area is served both by S-Bahn (by Dammtor station) and U-Bahn (by Stephansplatz station).

Photogallery

External links

Zones of Hamburg
Geography of Hamburg